Nasr (long form: El Nasr Automotive Manufacturing Company) is Egypt's state owned automobile company. It is the first Arab vehicle manufacturer, founded in 1960 in Helwan, Egypt. Since, the company has produced licensed versions of the Fiat 1100 R, Fiat 1300, Fiat 2300, Fiat 128, Fiat 125, Fiat 133, Fiat 126, series 2 Fiat 127, 1983–92 FSO Polonez and in 1991 introduced a further range of Fiat-designed cars licensed via the Turkish company Tofaş. In the early 2000s Nasr began producing the Florida range under license from Serbian manufacturer Zastava.

History

Nasr was a replacement for the short-lived Ramses automobile (also state produced), which suffered from poor design and performance (basically a redesigned NSU Prinz). The Nasr was intended to be an affordable car for the average person of means. The company's creation was also part of the general industrialization process initiated after the Egyptian Revolution of 1952, which would see millions of Egyptians flock to urban areas to gain work in newly built factories and industrial centers.

The decision to focus on assembly of foreign licensed cars under the Nasr marque was primarily based on the desire to avoid the engineering and design problems associated with previous attempts at domestic car manufacture. Furthermore, the compact and comparatively affordable Fiat-based cars (produced in conjunction with FSO and Zastava) were well suited to the Egyptian market. Nasr would later expand to production of utility and agricultural vehicles such as trucks.

As the years progressed, Nasr's best-selling model, the 128 GLS, began to show its age (its design had not been modified since the 1970s). Consequently, Nasr began production of a new range of vehicles, once again based on existing Fiat models, including the Regata, and Fiat-based models licensed by Tofaş, particularly the Dogan and Şahin. The early 21st century saw the relationship with Zastava expanded with production of the Nasr Florida.

Nasr's position in Egypt remains strong, largely due to its brand recognition and comparative affordability vis a vis foreign produced vehicles. However, its cars' relative lack of modern design (especially in terms of otherwise standard safety and comfort features), and the increased availability of low-to-mid range foreign brands in Egypt (such as Škoda) have increased the level of competition in Nasr's core market.

Nasr ended the production of passenger vehicles in 2009.

Discontinued Nasr produced automobiles

 Nasr Sahin 1400S and 1600 SL : based on the Tofaş Şahin Since 2005 started to make Fuel Injection Engine] - no longer in production
 Nasr 125: based on the Polski Fiat 125p - no longer in production
 Nasr 128 GLS 1300: based on the Zastava 128 - no longer in production
 Nasr Florida 1400: based on the Zastava Florida - no longer in production
 Nasr Polonez: based on the FSO Polonez from 1978-1991 years - no longer in production
 Nasr Dogan: based on the Tofaş Doğan  - no longer in production since 1995 (it was replaced by Sahin 1600 in 2005)
 Nasr Kartal : based on the Tofaş Kartal - no longer in production

Gallery

Production figures

 1962 - 863
 1963 - 3806
 1964 - 4527
 1965 - 4004
 1966 - 1615
 1967 - 108
 1968 - 758
 1969 - 2325
 1970 - 3590
 1971 - 5750
 2000 - 3201
 2001 - 3275
 2002 - 1903
 2003 - 1418
 2004 - 5898

Total production from 1961 until 2005 = 402.536 units. 
(Production statistics OICA data)

Other automobile manufacturers in Egypt

In addition to Nasr, other manufacturers such as:
 AAV - Arab American Vehicles, 
 the Ghabbour Group, 
 WAMCO - the Watania Automotive Manufacturing Company, 
 MCV Egypt - Manufacturing Commercial Vehicles, produce automobiles in Egypt. MCV Egypt was established in 1994 to represent Mercedes-Benz in the commercial vehicle sector in Egypt, producing a range of buses and trucks for domestic sale and for export throughout the Arab World, Africa, and Eastern Europe. The manufacturing plant at Salheya employs over 1000 people.

Notes

References
David Burgess Wise, The New Illustrated Encyclopedia of Automobiles.

External links

Automobile manufacturers of Egypt

Car manufacturers of Egypt
Egyptian brands
Cairo Governorate